WOXF (105.1 FM, "Q105") is an American radio station licensed to serve the community of Oxford, Mississippi. WOXF broadcasts a hot adult contemporary music format to the Oxford area.

WOXF is owned by Flinn Broadcasting, Inc.

References

External links

OXF
Hot adult contemporary radio stations in the United States
Lafayette County, Mississippi